Amrutha Suresh (born 2 August 1990) is an Indian singer, composer, songwriter, and radio jockey. She attained popularity after her stint at the reality television singing competition Idea Star Singer on Asianet in 2007. Since then, she has sung and composed for several films and music albums. She has been a celebrity radio jockey on Radio Suno 91.7 with the music show Suno Melodies. In 2014, she founded the music band Amrutam Gamay

Early life
Amrutha was born on 2 August 1990 to musician P. R. Suresh and Laila. Her father Suresh is a Hindu and mother Laila is a Christian. She has a sister, singer-composer Abhirami Suresh, who is five years younger. They are from Edappally, Kochi. Living in a family (paternal) of musicians inspired her to pursue music from a young age. Amrutha started singing at age three; Celine Dion and Michael Jackson are the singers who influenced her to become a singer. Amrutha was a topper at schools. Even though, she dropped 12th standard for contesting in the reality television singing competition Idea Star Singer, later she completed the course in private. She then took graduation in Bachelor of Business Administration (BBA) and post-graduation in Master of Business Administration (MBA), and also holds degrees in Carnatic music and Hindustani classical music.

Career

Music
Coming from a musician's family, she used to perform at stage shows during her childhood. While studying in eighth standard, she has been a child singer in Nadirshah's stage shows. In 2007, Amrutha contested in the second season of reality television singing competition Idea Star Singer on Asianet, she was one of the popular contestants on the show. It helped her foray into film industry. Since then, she has sung playback in a number of Malayalam films. Pulliman was her debut film as playback singer, composed by Sharreth. Her rendition of the song "Munthirpoo" from the film Aagathan (2010) was well received.

She sang "Kannu Karuthu" for music director Sharreth in his album Strawberry Theyyam (2014) which was a blend of folk and western orchestration, the song was particularly praised in the 9-track album. In 2014, Amritha founded the music band Amrutam Gamay. Amritha and her sister Abhirami Suresh are the lead vocalists of the band. The band performed internationally at gigs within six months of its formation. The band handles all kinds of genres, including Indian, western, folk, classical, or rock. The band's cover version of Israeli folk song "Hava Nagila" sang by Amritha was popular among the global Jewish community. The song gave her much appreciations. In 2015, Amritha and Abhirami wrote and composed multiple original songs for their band, including "Katturumbu", "Ayyayo", and "Harps of Peace".

In 2017, Amrutha released her first single, "Anayathe", which featured herself and was a tribute to motherhood and women. The song was positively received and garnered attention for its theme. After its release, Amritha got acting offers from some Tamil films, but she refused as she was not seeing herself as an actress at the time. She was also approached by a Canadian production company for an English film. In the same year, she began presenting the musical talk show Suno Melodies on Radio Suno 91.7 as a celebrity radio jockey. Amritha along with Abhirami composed, sang and acted in the title song of the film Crossroad that year. It was their debut composition in a film and was composed in a short notice. It was followed by a single in the film Aadu 2 (2017), titled "Aadu 2 – Success Song".

In 2019, she sang "Minni Minni" in the film June which was well received. For the song, she was nominated for the Mazhavil Music Award for Best Female Singer. In the same year, Amritha sang the first of the three music videos in DJ Savyo's Destiny, an experimental album which used Shiva mantra in the backdrop of electronic dance music. That year she also signed a project with Swedish musician Neil Luckz, who contacted her after watching her music video Ohm Nama Shivaya; she is working on six English songs for the project. In 2019, she sang a song in the children's film Sullu composed by Abhirami.

Other works
Amrutha is also into modelling. In 2017, she was featured in the cover of lifestyle magazine FWD Life. In the following year, she walked the ramp at Kerala Fashion Runway. She was also featured on the cover page of Vanitha Magazine along with her sister. In 2018, Amrutha started a hashtag campaign on Instagram known as Amazing Me, promoting self-esteem. It received positive response from public. In December 2018, Amrutha and her sister Abhirami started a YouTube channel, Amrutam Gamay – AG, with the series AG Vlogs to publish their creative content. The content is related to their personal lives, travel, food, music, shopping among other things. The series met with positive reception from viewers. In 2020, Amrutha and Abhirami entered as contestants in the second season of Malayalam reality television game show Bigg Boss (Malayalam season 2), hosted by actor Mohanlal on Asianet. They entered the Bigg Boss house as wildcard entrants on day-50 and plays as a pair.

Personal life
Amrutha first met her Ex husband Bala at the sets of the film Venalmaram in which he was starring and Amrutha was playback singer. Later, they developed a friendship-turned-romance while she was contesting in the reality TV singing competition Idea Star Singer in which he was a celebrity judge. They talked to each other's family and got married on 27 August 2010 at a ceremony held in Chennai. They were residing in Palarivattom, Kochi. They are reported to have started living separately in 2015, and got legal divorce in December 2019. They have a daughter named Avanthika (born 2012) who lives with her. She is currently in a relationship with popular music director Gopi Sundar Beside music, she is also a travel enthusiast.

Discography

Playback singer

TV Serial

Singles / Music videos

Albums

Filmography

Online appearances

Awards
 Creative Film Awards 2019 - for Best Singer Female - June 
 Ramu Kairat Sangeetha Award for Best Solo 2019 - June 
 Master Vision International Excellence Award (Singer) 2017

References

External links
 
 

Living people
1990 births
21st-century Indian women singers
21st-century Indian singers
Indian women playback singers
Indian women pop singers
Indian women folk singers
Indian women ghazal singers
Bhajan singers
Hindustani singers
Women Carnatic singers
Carnatic singers
Malayalam playback singers
Indian women composers
Indian women songwriters
Singers from Kochi
Indian women radio presenters
Singing talent show contestants
Bigg Boss Malayalam contestants